The number of species in the order Diptera (true flies) known to occur in Ireland is 3,304. There are 98 Dipteran families in Ireland.  For genera and species within the various Families, see Fauna Europaea.

Suborder Nematocera (thread-horns)

Superfamily Tipuloidea 

Tipulidae (crane flies) 57 species
including
Ctenophora (Ctenophora) pectinicornis (Linnaeus, 1758)
Dictenidia bimaculata (Linnaeus, 1761)
Dolichopeza albipes (Strom, 1768)
Tanyptera (Tanyptera) atrata (Linnaeus, 1758)
Nephrotoma appendiculata (Pierre, 1919)
Nephrotoma cornicina (Linnaeus, 1758)
Nephrotoma flavescens (Linnaeus, 1758)
Nephrotoma flavipalpis (Meigen, 1830) 
Nephrotoma scurra (Meigen, 1818)
Prionocera turcica (Fabricius, 1787) 
Tipula cava Riedel, 1913
Tipula confusa van der Wulp, 1883 
Tipula fascipennis Meigen, 1818 
Tipula hortorum Linnaeus, 1758
Tipula lateralis Meigen, 1804
Tipula lunata Linnaeus, 1758
Tipula luteipennis Meigen, 1830
Tipula oleracea Linnaeus, 1758
Tipula melanoceros Schummel, 1833 
Tipula paludosa Meigen, 1830
Tipula pruinosa Wiedemann, 1817
Tipula scripta Meigen, 1830
Tipula staegeri Nielsen, 1922
Tipula submarmorata Schummel, 1833 
Tipula unca Wiedemann, 1833
Tipula varipennis Meigen, 1818 
Tipula vittata Meigen, 1804
Cylindrotomidae (long-bodied craneflies) 3 species including
Cylindrotoma distinctissima (Meigen, 1818)
Pediciidae (hairy-eyed craneflies) 15 species
Pedicia rivosa (Linnaeus, 1758)
Pedicia occulta (Meigen, 1830) 
Tricyphona immaculata (Meigen, 1804)
Limoniidae (several crane flies) 130 species including
Achyrolimonia decemmaculata Loew, 1873
Austrolimnophila ochracea (Meigen, 1804)
Cheilotrichia cinerascens (Meigen, 1804)
Dactylolabis sexmaculata (Macquart, 1826)
Dicranomyia chorea (Meigen, 1818)
Dicranomyia didyma (Meigen, 1804) 
Dicranomyia fusca (Meigen, 1804)
Dicranomyia goritiensis (Mik, 1864)
Dicranomyia modesta (Meigen, 1818)
Dicranomyia sera (Walker, 1848)
Dicranophragma separatum (Walker, 1848)
Dicranota claripennis (Verrall, 1888)
Dicranota subtilis Loew, 1871  
Diogma glabrata (Meigen, 1818) 
Erioconopa trivialis (Meigen, 1818) 
Erioptera fuscipennis (Meigen, 1818) 
Erioptera lutea Meigen, 1804
Erioptera nielseni de Meijere, 1921
Erioconopa diuturna (Walker, 1848)
Erioconopa trivialis (Meigen, 1818)
Epiphragma ocellare (Linnaeus, 1758, 1760)
Euphylidorea aperta (Verrall, 1887)
Euphylidorea meigenii (Verrall, 1886) 
Geranomyia unicolor (Haliday, 1833)
Helius flavus (Walker, 1856) 
Limnophila schranki Oosterbroek, 1992
Limonia flavipes (Fabricius, 1787) 
Limonia nubeculosa Meigen, 1804
Limonia phragmitidis (Schrank, 1781)
Molophilus appendiculatus (Staeger, 1840)  
Molophilus ater Meigen, 1804
Molophilus flavus Goetghebuer, 1920 
Molophilus griseus (Meigen, 1804) 
Molophilus obscurus (Meigen, 1818)
Molophilus pleuralis de Meijere, 1920  
Neolimonia dumetorum (Meigen, 1804)
Ormosia nodulosa (Macquart, 1826)
Paradelphomyia senilis (Haliday, 1833)
Phylidorea ferruginea (Meigen, 1818)
Pilaria discicollis (Meigen, 1818)
Rhipidia maculata Meigen, 1818
Rhypholophus varius (Meigen, 1818)
Symplecta hybrida (Meigen, 1804) 
Symplecta pilipes (Fabricius, 1787)
Tasiocera murina (Meigen, 1818)

Superfamily Bibionoidea (march flies and lovebugs) 

Bibionidae 12 species including
Bibio johannis (Linnaeus, 1767)
Bibio lanigerus Meigen, 1818
Bibio leucopterus (Meigen 1804)
Bibio longipes Loew, 1864
Bibio marci (Linnaeus, 1758)
Bibio nigriventris Haliday, 1833
Bibio pomonae (Fabricius, 1775)
Bibio varipes Meigen, 1830
Dilophus febrilis (Linnaeus, 1758)

Superfamily Sciaroidea 
Bolitophilidae 6 species including
Bolitophila cinerea Meigen, 1818
Bolitophila saundersii (Curtis, 1836)
Diadocidiidae (some woodland flies) 2 species including
Diadocidia ferruginosa (Meigen, 1830)
Ditomyiidae 1 species
Symmerus annulatus (Meigen, 1830)
Keroplatidae (fungus gnats) 24 species including
Orfelia nemoralis (Meigen, 1818)
Isoneuromyia semirufa (Meigen, 1818)
Macrocera parva Lundstrom, 1914 
Mycetophilidae (fungus gnats) 242 species including
Acnemia nitidicollis (Meigen, 1818)
Boletina gripha Dziedzicki, 1885 
Boletina griphoides Edwards, 1925
Boletina trispinosa Edwards, 1913 
Boletina trivittata (Meigen, 1818)
Brachypeza bisignata Winnertz, 1863 
Brevicornu foliatum (Edwards, 1925)
Coelosia tenella Zetterstedt, 1852
Cordyla flaviceps (Stæger, 1840)
Diadocidia ferruginosa (Meigen, 1830)
Exechia contaminata Winnertz, 1863
Exechia spinuligera Lundstrom, 1912
Mycetophila edwardsi Lundstrom, 1913
Mycetophila formosa Lundstrom, 1911
Mycetophila fungorum (De Geer, 1776)
Mycetophila luctuosa Meigen, 1830
Mycomya cinerascens (Macquart, 1826)
Sciaridae (dark-winged fungus gnats) 104 species including
Bradysia ocellaris (Comstock, 1882)
Bradysia fungicola (Winnertz, 1867)
Bradysia praecox (Meigen, 1818) 
Corynoptera forcipata (Winnertz, 1867)
Leptosciarella pilosa (Staeger 1840) 
Leptosciarella subspinulosa Edwards 1925 
Leptosciarella trochanterata (Zetterstedt 1851)
Leptosciarella yerburyi (Freeman 1983) 
Sciara hemerobioides (Scopoli, 1763)
Cecidomyiidae (gall midges / gall gnats) 100 species including
Sitodiplosis mosellana (Gehin, 1857)
Aphidoletes aphidimyza (Rondani, 1847)
Contarinia nasturtii (Kieffer, 1888)
Kiefferia pericarpiicola (Bremi, 1847)
Dasineura crataegi (Winnertz, 1853)
Dasineura ulmariae (Bremi, 1847)
Dasineura urticae (Perris, 1840)
Dasineura pteridis (Müller, 1871)
Rondaniola bursaria (Bremi, 1847)
Geocrypta galii Loew, 1850
Hartigiola annulipes (Hartig, 1839)

Superfamily Psychodoidea (moth fly) 
Psychodidae 67 species including
Boreoclytocerus ocellaris (Meigen 1818)
Ulomyia fuliginosa (Meigen, 1818)

Superfamily Trichoceroidea (winter crane flies) 
Trichoceridae 6 species including
Trichocera annulata Meigen, 1818

Superfamily Anisopodoidea (wood gnats, window gnats)
Anisopodidae 4 species including
Sylvicola cinctus (Fabricius, 1787) 
Sylvicola fenestralis (Scopoli, 1763)
Sylvicola punctatus (Fabricius, 1787) 
Mycetobiidae 2 species

Superfamily Scatopsoidea
Scatopsidae (minute black scavenger flies) 23 species including
Scatopse notata (Linnaeus, 1758)
Apiloscatopse bifilata (Haliday in Walker, 1856)
Apiloscatopse scutellata (Loew, 1846)
Coboldia fuscipes (Meigen, 1830)

Superfamily Ptychopteroidea 
Ptychopteridae (phantom crane flies) 6 species including
Ptychoptera albimana (Fabricius, 1787)
Ptychoptera contaminata (Linnaeus, 1758)
Ptychoptera minuta Tonnoir, 1919

Superfamily Culicoidea 

Dixidae (meniscus midges) 14 species including
Dixa nebulosa Meigen, 1830
Dixa dilatata Strobl, 1900
Dixa nubilipennis Curtis, 1832 
Dixella martinii (Peus, 1934)
Chaoboridae (phantom midges) 5 species including
Chaoborus flavicans (Meigen, 1830)
Culicidae (mosquitoes) 17 species including
Aedes rusticus (Rossi, 1790)
Culex pipiens Linnaeus, 1758
Culiseta annulata (Schrank, 1776)

Superfamily Chironomoidea

Thaumaleidae (solitary/trickle midges) 2 species including
Thaumalea verralli Edwards, 1929
Simuliidae (Black flies) 28 species including
Simulium latipes (Meigen, 1804)
Simulium variegatum Meigen, 1818
Ceratopogonidae (biting midges) 64 species including 
Culicoides impunctatus Goetghebuer, 1920
Chironomidae (nonbiting midges) 475 species including
Ablabesmyia monilis (Linnaeus, 1758) 
Chaetocladius suecicus (Kieffer, 1916)
Chironomus anthracinus Zetterstedt, 1860
Chironomus plumosus (Linnaeus, 1758)
Cricotopus bicinctus (Meigen, 1818)
Glyptotendipes pallens (Meigen, 1804)
Macropelopia nebulosa (Meigen, 1804)
Phaenopsectra flavipes (Meigen, 1818) 
Prodiamesa olivacea (Meigen, 1818)

Suborder Brachycera (flies with reduced antenna segmentation)
See also List of Diptera of Ireland Superfamilies Xylophagoidea, Tabanoidea, Stratiomyoidea, Nemestrinoidea, Asiloidea

Superfamily Xylophagoidea
Xylophagidae (awl-flies) 1 species

Superfamily Tabanoidea 
Athericidae (water snipe flies / ibis flies) 2 species
Rhagionidae (snipe flies) 5 species
Spaniidae 2 species
Tabanidae (horseflies) 10 species

Superfamily Stratiomyoidea
Stratiomyidae (soldier flies)

Superfamily Nemestrinoidea 
Acroceridae (small-headed flies, hunch-back flies, spider flies) 1 species

Superfamily Asiloidea
Bombyliidae (bee flies) 4 species
Therevidae (stiletto flies) 4 species
Scenopinidae (window flies) 2 species
Asilidae (robber flies / assassin flies) 3 species

Superfamily Empidoidea 
Atelestidae 1 species
Hybotidae (dance flies) 77 species including
Bicellaria vana Collin, 1926
Bicellaria nigra (Meigen 1824)
Hybos culiciformis (Fabricius, 1775)
Hybos femoratus (Muller, 1776)
Leptopeza flavipes (Meigen, 1820) 
Ocydromia glabricula (Fallen, 1816)
Platypalpus candicans (Fallén, 1815) 
Platypalpus luteus (Meigen, 1804)
Platypalpus notatus (Meigen, 1822)
Tachydromia arrogans (Linnaeus, 1758, 1761)
Tachydromia umbrarum Haliday, 1833 
Empididae (dagger flies / balloon flies) 99 species including
Clinocera fontinalis (Haliday, 1833)
Dolichocephala irrorata (Fallén, 1816)
Dolichocephala guttata Haliday 1833
Empis albinervis Meigen, 1822
Empis borealis Linnaeus, 1758
Empis chioptera Meigen, 1804
Empis digramma Meigen in Gistl, 1835
Empis femorata Fabricius, 1798
Empis livida Linnaeus, 1758
Empis lucida Zetterstedt, 1838
Empis lutea Meigen, 1804
Empis nigripes Fabricius, 1794
Empis nuntia Meigen, 1838
Empis opaca Meigen, 1804
Empis pennipes Linnaeus, 1758
Empis planetica Collin, 1927
Empis stercorea Linnaeus, 1761
Empis tessellata Fabricius, 1794
Empis trigramma Wiedemann in Meigen, 1822
Empis verralli Collin, 1927
Heleodromia immaculata Haliday, 1833
Hilara brevistyla Collin, 1927
Hilara galactoptera Strobl, 1910
Hilara interstincta (Fallén, 1816
Hilara litorea (Fallén, 1816)
Hilara maura (Fabricius, 1776)
Hilara thoracica Macquart, 1827
Phyllodromia melanocephala (Fabricius 1794) 
Rhamphomyia albohirta Collin, 1926 
Rhamphomyia crassirostris (Fallén, 1816)
Rhamphomyia erythrophthalma Meigen, 1830 
Rhamphomyia flava (Fallen, 1816)
Rhamphomyia hirsutipes Collin, 1926 
Rhamphomyia lamellata Collin, 1926
Rhamphomyia nigripennis (Fabricius, 1794)
Rhamphomyia nitidula Zetterstedt, 1842 
Rhamphomyia pilifer Meigen, 1838
Rhamphomyia simplex Zetterstedt, 1849
Rhamphomyia stigmosa Macquart, 1827 
Rhamphomyia sulcata (Meigen, 1804)
Rhamphomyia umbripennis Meigen, 1838
Trichopeza longicornis (Meigen, 1822)
Microphoridae 3 species
Dolichopodidae (long-legged flies) 158 species including
Anepsiomyia flaviventris (Meigen, 1824)
Aphrosylus celtiber Haliday, 1855
Argyra argyria (Meigen, 1824)
Argyra diaphana (Fabricius, 1775)
Campsicnemus curvipes (Fallen, 1823)
Campsicnemus loripes (Haliday, 1832)
Campsicnemus scambus (Fallen, 1823)
Chrysotus neglectus (Wiedemann, 1817)
Diaphorus oculatus (Fallén, 1823)
Dolichopus atratus Meigen, 1824
Dolichopus clavipes Haliday, 1832
Dolichopus diadema Haliday, 1832
Dolichopus discifer Stannius, 1831
Dolichopus griseipennis Stannius, 1831
Dolichopus lepidus Staeger, 1842
Dolichopus longicornis Stannius, 1831
Dolichopus nubilus Meigen, 1824
Dolichopus pennatus Meigen, 1824
Dolichopus picipes Meigen, 1824
Dolichopus plumipes (Scopoli, 1763)
Dolichopus sabinus Haliday, 1838
Dolichopus simplex Meigen, 1824
Dolichopus ungulatus (Linnaeus, 1758)
Dolichopus urbanus Meigen, 1824
Dolichopus vitripennis Meigen, 1824
Gymnopternus aerosus (Fallen, 1823)
Gymnopternus celer (Meigen, 1824)
Gymnopternus cupreus (Fallen, 1823)
Hercostomus nigripennis (Fallén, 1823)
Hydrophorus nebulosus Fallén, 1823
Hydrophorus oceanus (Macquart, 1838)
Hydrophorus praecox (Lehmann, 1822)
Lianculus virens (Scopoli, 1763)
Medetera petrophiloides Parent, 1925 
Medetera truncorum Meigen, 1824
Rhaphium appendiculatum Zetterstedt, 1849 
Rhaphium consobrinum Zetterstedt, 1843  
Rhaphium crassipes (Meigen 1824) 
Scellus notatus (Fabricius, 1781)
Sciapus platypterus (Fabricius, 1805)
Sciapus wiedemanni (Fallen, 1823)
Sybistroma obscurellum (Fallén, 1823)
Sympycnus desoutteri Parent, 1925
Syntormon pallipes (Fabricius, 1794)
Tachytrechus notatus (Stannius, 1831) 
Thinophilus ruficornis (Haliday, 1838 in Curtis)

Superfamily Platypezoidea 
Opetiidae (flat-footed flies) 1 species
Opetia nigra Meigen, 1830
Platypezidae (flat-footed flies) 16 species including
Callomyia elegans Meigen, 1804
Phoridae (scuttle flies / coffin flies) 151 species including
Megaselia scalaris Loew, 1866
Borophaga incrassata Meigen, 1830

Superfamily Lonchopteroidea (spear-winged flies or pointed-wing flies) 
Lonchopteridae 3 species including
Lonchoptera lutea Panzer, 1809

Superfamily Syrphoidea 

Syrphidae (hoverflies, flower flies) 183 species
see List of the Syrphidae of Ireland
Pipunculidae (big-headed flies) 31 species including
Cephalops aeneus Fallen 1810
Cephalops obtusinervis (Zetterstedt 1844)
Chalarus spurius (Fallen 1816)
Dorylomorpha xanthopus (Thomson 1870)
Pipunculus thomsoni Becker 1897 
Tomosvaryella littoralis (Becker 1897)
Verrallia aucta (Fallen 1817)

Superfamily Nerioidea
Micropezidae (stilt-legged flies) 3 species including
Calobata petronella (Linnaeus, 1761)

Superfamily Diopsoidea
Psilidae (rust flies) 19 species including
Chamaepsila (Chamaepsila) rosae (Fabricius, 1794)
Chyliza leptogaster Panzer, 1798
Loxocera albiseta (Schrank, 1803) 
Loxocera aristata (Panzer, 1801)
Psila fimetaria (Linnaeus, 1761)

Superfamily Conopoidea (thick-headed flies)
Conopidae (thick-headed flies) 11 species including
Conops quadrifasciatus De Geer, 1776
Sicus ferrugineus (Linnaeus, 1761)
Myopa buccata (Linnaeus, 1758)

Superfamily Tephritoidea 
Lonchaeidae (lance flies) 14 species including
Lonchaea chorea (Fabricius, 1781)
Setisquamalonchaea fumosa (Egger, 1862) 
Pallopteridae (flutter-wing / trembling-wing / waving-wing flies) 10 species including
Palloptera muliebris (Harris, [1780])
Palloptera ustulata Fallen, 1820 
Piophilidae (cheese flies) 7 species including
Piophila casei (Linnaeus, 1758)
Ulidiidae (picture-winged flies) 6 species including
Ceroxys urticae (Linnaeus 1758)
Herina frondescentiae (Linnaeus, 1758)
Herina lugubris (Meigen 1826)
Seioptera vibrans (Linnaeus, 1758)
Tetanops myopina Fallen, 1820
Platystomatidae (signal flies) 2 species including
Platystoma seminationis (Fabricius, 1775) 
Tephritidae (fruit flies, peacock flies) 27 species including
Acidia cognata (Wiedemann, 1817)
Anomoia purmunda (Harris 1780)
Campiglossa absinthii (Fabricius, 1805)
Campiglossa loewiana (Hendel, 1927)
Ensina sonchi (Linnaeus, 1767)
Euleia heraclei (Linnaeus, 1758)
Philophylla caesio (Harris 1780)
Sphenella marginata (Fallén, 1814) 
Tephritis bardanae (Shrank, 1803)
Tephritis conura (Loew, 1844)
Tephritis formosa (Loew, 1844)
Tephritis hyoscyami (Linnaeus, 1758)
Tephritis leontodontis (De Geer, 1776) 
Tephritis neesii (Meigen, 1830)
Tephritis vespertina (Loew, 1844) 
Terellia ruficauda (Fabricius, 1794) 
Terellia serratulae (Linnaeus, 1758)
Trupanea stellata (Fuesslin 1775)
Trypeta zoe Meigen, 1826
Urophora jaceana (Hering 1935)
Urophora stylata (Fabricius, 1775)
Xyphosia miliaria Schrank, 1781

Superfamily Lauxanioidea 
Lauxaniidae 35 species including
Calliopum aeneum (Fallen, 1820)
Lauxania cylindricornis (Fabricius, 1794)
Meiosimyza rorida (Fallén, 1820)
Minettia inusta (Meigen, 1826)
Minettia longipennis (Fabricius, 1794)
Peplomyza litura (Meigen, 1826) 
Sapromyza quadricincta Becker, 1895
Sapromyza quadripunctata (Linnaeus, 1767)
Tricholauxania praeusta Fallén, 1820
Chamaemyiidae 8 species including
Chamaemyia flavipalpis (Haliday, 1838)

Superfamily Sciomyzidea
Coelopidae (kelp flies) 3 species including
Coelopa frigida (Fabricius, 1805)
Dryomyzidae 3 species including
Dryomyza anilis Fallén, 1820
Helcomyzidae 1 species
Helcomyza ustulata Curtis, 1825
Heterocheilidae (half-bridge flies) 1 species
Heterocheila buccata (Fallen, 1820)
Sciomyzidae (marsh flies, snail-killing flies) 55 species including
Anticheta analis (Meigen, 1830)
Anticheta brevipennis (Zetterstedt, 1846)
Colobaea punctata (Lundbeck, 1923)
Coremacera marginata (Fabricius, 1775)
Dictya umbrarum (Linnaeus, 1758)
Ditaeniella grisescens (Meigen, 1830)
Elgiva cucularia (Linnaeus, 1767)
Elgiva solicita (Harris, 1780)
Hydromya dorsalis (Fabricius, 1775)
Ilione albiseta (Scopoli, 1763) 
Ilione lineata (Fallen, 1820) 
Limnia unguicornis (Scopoli, 1763)
Pherbellia argyra Verbeke, 1967
Pherbellia cinerella (Fallen, 1820)
Pherbellia nana (Fallen, 1820)
Pherbellia schoenherri (Fallén, 1826) 
Pherbellia ventralis (Fallén, 1820)
Pherbina coryleti (Scopoli, 1763)
Pteromicra angustipennis (Staeger, 1845) 
Renocera pallida (Fallén, 1820)
Renocera strobili Hendel, 1900  
Sepedon sphegea (Fabricius, 1775)
Sepedon spinipes (Scopoli, 1763)
Tetanocera arrogans Meigen, 1830 
Tetanocera elata (Fabricius, 1781)
Tetanocera ferruginea Fallén, 1820  
Tetanocera robusta Loew, 1847 
Trypetoptera punctulata (Scopoli, 1763) 
Sepsidae (black scavenger flies, ensign flies) 19 species including
Nemopoda nitidula (Fallen, 1820)
Saltella sphondylii (Schrank, 1803) 
Sepsis fulgens Meigen, 1826
Sepsis punctum (Fabricius, 1794)
Sepsis violacea Meigen, 1826
Themira annulipes (Meigen, 1826)
Themira putris (Linnaeus, 1758)

Superfamily Opomyzoidea
Clusiidae (druid flies) 5 species including
Paraclusia tigrina (Fallen, 1820)
Odiniidae 2 species including
Odinia boletina (Zetterstedt 1848)
Agromyzidae (leaf-miner flies) 114 species including
Agromyza albipennis Meigen 1830
Agromyza nana Meigen 1830
Agromyza nigripes Meigen, 1830
Nemorimyza posticata (Meigen, 1830)
Phytoliriomyza melampyga (Loew, 1869)
Phytomyza affinis Fallen, 1823
Phytomyza ranunculi (Schrank, 1803)
Opomyzidae 8 species including
Geomyza tripunctata Fallén, 1823 
Opomyza florum (Fabricius, 1794)
Opomyza petrei Mesnil, 1934
Anthomyzidae 6 species including
Stiphrosoma sabulosum (Haliday, 1837)
Anthomyza gracilis Fallen, 1823
Aulacigastridae (sap flies) 1 species
Stenomicridae 1 species
Asteiidae 3 species including
Asteia amoena Meigen, 1830
Leiomyza scatophagina (Fallen, 1823)
Leiomyza laevigata (Meigen, 1830)

Superfamily Carnoidea 
Milichiidae (freeloader flies, filth flies, jackal flies) 2 species
Carnidae (bird flies / filth flies) 2 species
Braulidae (bee lice) 1 species
Braula coeca Nitzsch, 1818
Canacidae (beach flies, surf flies, surge flies) 6 species including
Canace nasica (Haliday, 1839)
Chloropidae (frit flies, eye gnats, eye flies, grass flies) 70 species including
Cetema elongatum (Meigen, 1830)
Chlorops planifrons (Loew, 1866)
Chlorops pumilionis (Bjerkander, 1778)
Dicraeus vagans Meigen, 1838
Diplotoxa messoria Fallen, 1820
Elachiptera cornuta Fallen, 1820
Melanum laterale Haliday, 1833
Meromyza femorata Macquart, 1835 
Meromyza pratorum Meigen, 1830
Meromyza triangulina Fedoseeva, 1960

Superfamily Sphaeroceroidea 
Heleomyzidae 33 species including
Heleomyza serrata (Linnaeus 1758)
Heteromyza rotundicornis (Zetterstedt, 1846) 
Scoliocentra villosa (Meigen, 1830)
Suillia affinis (Meigen, 1830)
Suillia bicolor (Zetterstedt, 1838)
Suillia humilis (Meigen, 1830)
Suillia imberbis Czerny, 1924
Suillia variegata (Loew, 1862)
Morpholeria ruficornis (Meigen, 1830)
Tephrochlamys rufiventris (Meigen, 1830)
Trichoscelididae 2 species
Chyromyidae 3 species including
Gymnochiromyia flavella (Zetterstedt, 1848)
Sphaeroceridae (small dung flies, lesser dung flies, lesser corpse flies) 72 species including 
Copromyza nigrina (Gimmerthal 1847)
Copromyza stercoraria (Meigen, 1830)
Copromyza equina Fallén 1820
Crumomyia roserii Rondani, 1880
Crumomyia fimetaria Meigen, 1830
Crumomyia nitida (Meigen, 1830)
Leptocera fontinalis (Fallen, 1826)
Limosina silvatica Meigen, 1830 
Lotophila atra (Meigen, 1830)
Thoracochaeta brachystoma Stenhammar, 1854
Thoracochaeta zosterae (Haliday, 1833)

Superfamily Ephydroidea
Drosophilidae 30 species including
Chymomyza fuscimana (Zetterstedt, 1938)
Drosophila melanogaster Meigen 1830
Drosophila subobscura Collin 1936
Drosophila tristis Fallen, 1823
Lordiphosa andalusiaca (Strobl, 1906)
Scaptomyza flava (Fallen, 1823)
Stegana coleoptrata (Scopoli 1763)
Campichoetidae 2 species including
Campichoeta obscuripennis (Meigen, 1830)
Diastatidae 4 species including
Diastata adusta Meigen, 1830
Diastata costata Meigen, 1830
Diastata fuscula (Fallen, 1823)
Diastata nebulosa (Fallen, 1823)
Camillidae 1 species
Camilla flavicauda Duda, 1922
Ephydridae (shore flies, brine flies) 68 species including
Dichaeta caudata (Fallen, 1813) 
Discomyza incurva (Fallen, 1823)
Ilythea spilota Curtis, 1832
Limnellia quadrata (Fallen, 1813)
Notiphila aenea Waltl, 1837
Notiphila riparia Meigen, 1830
Ochthera mantis De Geer, 1776
Paracoenia fumosa (Stenhammar, 1844)
Parydra aquila (Fallen, 1813)
Parydra fossarum (Haliday, 1833)

Superfamily Hippoboscoidea
Hippoboscidae (louse flies, keds) 8 species including
Hippobosca equina Linnaeus 1758
Crataerina pallida (Olivier in Latreille, 1812)
Lipoptena cervi (Linnaeus, 1758)
Melophagus ovinus (Linnaeus, 1758)
Ornithomya avicularia (Linnaeus 1758)
Ornithomya fringillina Curtis, 1836 
Stenepteryx hirundinis (Linnaeus 1758) 
Nycteribiidae (bat flies) 2 species including
Nycteribia kolenatii Theodor & Moscona, 1954

Superfamily Muscoidea
Scathophagidae (dung flies) 33 species including
Chaetosa punctipes Meigen, 1826
Cleigastra apicalis (Meigen, 1826)
Cordilura albipes Fallen, 1819
Cordilura pudica Meigen, 1826
Nanna inermis (Becker 1894)
Norellia spinipes (Meigen, 1826)
Norellisoma spinimanum (Fallen 1819)
Scathophaga furcata (Say, 1823)
Scathophaga inquinata (Meigen, 1826) 
Scathophaga litorea (Fallén, 1819)  
Scathophaga stercoraria (Linnaeus 1758)
Scathophaga suilla (Fabricius, 1794) 
Spaziphora hydromyzina (Fallen, 1819)
Trichopalpus fraternus (Meigen, 1826) 
Anthomyiidae 93 species including
Alliopsis billbergi (Zetterstedt, 1838)
Anthomyia confusanea Michelsen in Michelsen & Baez, 1985
Anthomyia bazini Seguy, 1929
Botanophila discreta (Meigen, 1826)
Botanophila fugax (Meigen, 1826)
Chirosia betuleti (Ringdahl, 1935)
Delia albula (Fallén, 1825) 
Delia antiqua (Meigen, 1826)
Delia radicum (Linnaeus, 1758)
Delia floralis (Fallén, 1824)
Fucellia fucorum (Fallen, 1819)
Hylemya nigrimana (Meigen, 1826)
Hylemya urbica Wulp, 1896
Hylemya vagans (Panzer, 1798) 
Hylemya variata (Fallen, 1823)
Hydrophoria lancifer (Harris, [1780]) 
Hydrophoria ruralis (Meigen, 1826)
Lasiomma seminitidum (Zetterstedt, 1845)
Mycophaga testacea (Gimmerthal, 1834)
Myopina myopina (Fallen, 1824)
Paradelia intersecta (Meigen, 1826) 
Pegomya betae (Curtis, 1847)
Pegomya bicolor (Wiedemann, 1817)
Pegomya rubivora (Coquillett, 1897)
Pegomya solennis (Meigen, 1826)
Pegoplata aestiva (Meigen, 1826)
Pegoplata infirma (Meigen, 1826)
Fanniidae 27 species including
Fannia armata (Meigen, 1826)
Fannia canicularis (Linnaeus, 1761)
Fannia lepida (Wiedemann, 1817)
Fannia lustrator (Harris, 1780)
Fannia mollissima (Haliday, 1840)
Fannia pusio (Wiedemann, 1830)
Fannia rondanii (Strobl, 1893)
Fannia scalaris (Fabricius, 1794)
Fannia serena (Fallén, 1825)
Fannia sociella (Zetterstedt, 1845)
Muscidae (house flies, stable flies) 163 species including
Achanthiptera rohrelliformis (Robineau-Desvoidy, 1830) 
Azelia cilipes (Haliday, 1838)
Azelia nebulosa Robineau-Desvoidy, 1830
Coenosia albicornis Meigen, 1826
Coenosia agromyzina (Fallen, 1825)
Coenosia antennata (Zetterstedt, 1849)
Coenosia mollicula (Fallen, 1825)
Coenosia testacea (Robineau-Desvoidy, 1830)
Coenosia tigrina (Fabricius, 1775)
Coenosia verralli Collin, 1953
Graphomya maculata (Scopoli, 1763)
Haematobia irritans (Linnaeus, 1758)
Haematobosca stimulans (Meigen, 1824)
Hebecnema umbratica (Meigen, 1826)
Hebecnema nigra (Robineau-Desvoidy, 1830)
Hebecnema nigricolor (Fallen, 1825)
Hebecnema vespertina (Fallén, 1823)
Helina allotalla (Meigen, 1830)
Helina confinis (Fallén, 1825)
Helina depuncta (Fallén, 1825)
Helina evecta (Harris, 1780)
Helina impuncta (Fallén, 1825)
Helina maculipennis (Zetterstedt, 1845)
Helina protuberans (Zetterstedt, 1845)
Helina reversio (Harris, 1780)
Helina setiventris Ringdahl, 1924
Hydrotaea albipuncta (Zetterstedt, 1845)
Hydrotaea cyrtoneurina (Zetterstedt, 1845)
Hydrotaea dentipes (Fabricius, 1805)
Limnophora tigrina Am Stein, 1860
Limnophora triangula (Fallén, 1825)
Lispe pygmaea Fallen, 1825
Lispe tentaculata (De Geer, 1776) 
Lispocephala alma (Meigen, 1826)
Lispocephala erythrocera (Robineau-Desvoidy, 1830)
Lophosceles cinereiventris (Zetterstedt, 1845)
Mesembrina meridiana (Linnaeus, 1758)
Morellia aenescens Robineau-Desvoidy, 1830
Morellia simplex (Loew, 1857)
Musca autumnalis De Geer, 1776
Musca domestica Linnaeus, 1758
Muscina levida (Harris, 1780)
Mydaea corni (Scopoli, 1763)
Mydaea setifemur Ringdahl, 1924
Mydaea urbana (Meigen, 1826)
Myospila meditabunda (Fabricius, 1781)
Phaonia angelicae (Scopoli, 1763)
Phaonia cincta (Zetterstedt, 1846)
Phaonia errans (Meigen, 1826)
Phaonia fuscata (Fallén, 1825)
Phaonia halterata (Stein, 1893) 
Phaonia incana (Wiedemann, 1817) 
Phaonia pallida (Fabricius, 1787)
Phaonia palpata (Stein, 1897)
Phaonia perdita (Meigen, 1830)
Phaonia rufiventris (Scopoli, 1763) 
Phaonia subventa (Harris, 1780)
Phaonia tuguriorum (Scopoli, 1763)
Phaonia valida (Harris, 1780)
Schoenomyza litorella (Fallen, 1823) 
Spilogona aerea (Fallén, 1825) 
Spilogona denigrata (Meigen, 1826)
Thricops diaphanus (Wiedemann, 1817) 
Thricops rostratus (Meade, 1882) 
Thricops semicinereus (Wiedemann, 1817) 
Villeneuvia aestuum (Villeneuve, 1902)

Superfamily Oestroidea
Calliphoridae (blow-flies, carrion flies, bluebottles, greenbottles, cluster flies) 20 species including
Calliphora vicina Robineau-Desvoidy 1830
Calliphora vomitoria (Linnaeus 1758)
Lucilia caesar (Linnaeus 1758)
Lucilia illustris (Meigen 1826)
Lucilia sericata (Meigen 1826)
Lucilia silvarum (Meigen 1826)
Melinda viridicyanea (Robineau-Desvoidy 1830)
Phormia regina (Meigen 1826)
Pollenia rudis (Fabricius 1794)
Protophormia terraenovae (Robineau-Desvoidy 1830)
Rhinophoridae 4 species including
Melanophora roralis (Linnaeus 1758)
Paykullia maculata (Fallen, 1815) 
Rhinophora lepida (Meigen 1824)
Sarcophagidae (flesh flies) 24 species including
Miltogramma punctata Meigen, 1824
Sarcophaga africa (Wiedemann 1824)
Sarcophaga aratrix Pandelle, 1896
Sarcophaga carnaria (Linnaeus 1758)
Sarcophaga incisilobata Pandellé, 1896
Sarcophaga sinuata Meigen, 1826 
Sarcophaga subvicina Baranov, 1937
Sarcophaga teretirostris Pandelle, 1896
Sarcophaga vagans Meigen, 1826 
Tachinidae 65 species including
Gymnosoma rotundatum (Linnaeus, 1758)
Actia pilipennis (Fallén, 1810)	
Aplomya confinis (Fallen 1820)
Blondelia nigripes (Fallén, 1810)
Carcelia lucorum (Meigen 1824)
Compsilura concinnata (Meigen 1824)
Cylindromyia brassicaria (Fabricius 1775)
Cyzenis albicans (Fallén, 1810)
Dexiosoma caninum (Fabricius, 1781)
Eriothrix rufomaculata (DeGeer, 1776)
Eurithia anthophila (Robineau-Desvoidy, 1830)
Eurithia connivens Zetterstedt, 1844
Exorista larvarum (Linnaeus, 1758)
Gonia capitata (De Geer, 1776)
Gonia picea (Robineau-Desvoidy, 1830)
Gymnocheta viridis (Fallén, 1810)
Linnaemya vulpina (Fallén, 1810)
Loewia foeda (Meigen 1824)
Lophosia fasciata Meigen, 1824
Lydella stabulans (Meigen 1824)
Lydina aenea (Meigen, 1824)
Lypha dubia (Fallén, 1810)
Macquartia dispar (Fallén, 1820)
Macquartia grisea (Fallén, 1810)
Medina collaris (Fallen 1820)
Nilea hortulana (Meigen 1824)
Pales pavida (Meigen 1824)
Phasia hemiptera (Fabricius, 1794)
Phasia obesa (Fabricius, 1798)
Phryxe nemea (Meigen, 1824) 
Phryxe vulgaris (Fallen 1810)
Phytomyptera nigrina (Meigen 1824)
Platymya fimbriata (Meigen 1824)
Prosena siberita (Fabricius 1775)
Siphona geniculata (De Geer 1776)
Siphona maculata Zetterstedt, 1849
Tachina fera (Linnaeus 1761)
Tachina grossa (Linnaeus 1758)
Thelaira nigripes (Fallén, 1817)
Voria ruralis (Fallen 1810)
Campylocheta inepta Meigen, 1824
Oestridae (bot flies, warble flies, heel flies, gadflies) 6 species including
Cephenemyia stimulator (Clark 1851)
Gasterophilus intestinalis (De Geer 1776)
Hypoderma bovis (Linnaeus 1758)
Hypoderma lineatum (Villers 1789)
Oestrus ovis Linnaeus 1758

Identification and descriptions, line drawings
Faune de France Bibliotheque-virtuelle-numerique Titles available as free pdf
Séguy, E., 1923. Diptères Anthomyides. 393 p., 813 fig. Faune n° 6 
Pierre, C., 1924. Diptères : Tipulidae. 159 p. Faune n° 8 
Séguy, E., 1926. Diptères Brachycères. 308 p., 685 fig. Faune n° 13 
Séguy, E., 1927. Diptères Asilidae. 188 p., 389 fig. Faune n° 17 
Goetghebuer. M., 1932. Diptères Nématocères Chironomidae. IV. 196 p., 315 fig. Faune n° 23  
Séguy, E., 1934. Diptères (Brachycères). 832 p., 903 fig Faune n° 23 .
Parent, O., 1938. Diptères Dolichopodidae. 720 p., 1 002 fig. Faune n° 35 
Séguy, E., 1940. Diptères (Nématocères). 367 p., 414 fig. Faune n° 36

References

External links
Dipterists Forum Recent updates
West Palearctic Distribution Fauna Europaea
Faune de France Insectes Insectes Diptères pdfs free downloads
Royal Entomological Society Handbooks Out of print parts available as free pdfs are:
Vol 9 Part 1. Diptera - 1. Introduction and key to families. H. Oldroyd.
Vol 9 Part 2 i. Diptera - 2. Nematocera: families Tipulidae to Chironomidae (Tipulidae). R. L. Coe, Paul Freeman & P. F. Mattingly
Vol 9 Part 2 ii. Diptera - 2. Nematocera: families Tipulidae to Chironomidae (Trichoceridae - Culicidae). R. L. Coe, Paul Freeman & P. F. Mattingly
Vol 9 Part 2 iii. Diptera - 2. Nematocera: families Tipulidae to Chironomidae (Chironomidae). R. L. Coe, Paul Freeman & P. F. Mattingly
Vol 9 Part 3. Diptera - Nematocera. Mycetophilidae (Bolitophilinae, Ditomyiinae, Diadocidiinae, Keroplatinae, Sciophilinae and Manotinae). A. M. Hutson, D. M. Ackland and L. N. Kidd
Vol 9 Part 4a. Diptera - Brachycera. Tabanoidea and Asiloidea. Harold Oldroyd
Vol 9 Part 5. Diptera - Orthorrhapha Brachycera. Dolichopodidae. E. C. M. d'Assis Fonseca
Vol 10 Part 1. Diptera. Syrphidae. R. L. Coe
Vol 10 Part 2c. Diptera. Pipunculidae. R. L. Coe
Vol 10 Part 3a. Diptera - Conopidae. Kenneth G. V. Smith
Vol 10 Part 4a i. Diptera - Cyclorrhapha. Calyptrata (1) Section (a) Tachinidae and Calliphoridae (Tachinidae). F. I. van Emden
Vol 10 Part 4a ii. Diptera - Cyclorrhapha. Calyptrata (1) Section (a) Tachinidae and Calliphoridae (Calliphoridae). F. I. van Emden
Vol 10 Part 4b. Diptera - Cyclorrhapha Calyptrata, Section (b) Muscidae. E. C. M. d'Assis Fonseca
Vol 10 Part 5a. Diptera - Tephritidae. I.M White
Vol 10 Part 5g. Diptera - Agromyzidae. Kenneth A. Spencer
Vol 10 Part 7. Diptera - Hippoboscidae and Nycteribiidae (Keds, Flat-Flies and Bat-Flies). A.M.Hutson
Vol 10 Part 8. Diptera - Phoridae Genus Megaselia (Scuttle Flies). R.H.L. Disney
Vol 10 Part 14. An introduction to the immature stages of British Flies. Diptera Larvae, with notes on eggs, puparia and pupae. Main text. K. G. V. Smith
Vol 10 Part 14. An introduction to the immature stages of British Flies. Diptera Larvae, with notes on eggs, puparia and pupae. Figures 
 

Ireland, diptera
Diptera
Diptera of Europe